Mentorship is the developmental relationship between a more experienced mentor and a less experienced partner referred to as a protégé or mentee.

Mentor, Mentors, or The Mentor may also refer to:

Greek mythology
 Mentor (Greek myth), any of several Greek mythological characters
 Mentor (Odyssey)

People
 Mentor of Rhodes, a Greek mercenary
 Mentor Graham (1800–1886), a U.S. teacher
 Mentor Huebner (1917–2001), a U.S. film illustrator
 Mentor Mazrekaj (born 1989), an Albanian soccer player
 Mentor Përmeti (1920–2015), an Albanian agronomist
 Mentor Williams (1946–2016), a U.S. musician
 Mentor Xhemali (1926–1992), an Albanian singer
 Mentor Zhdrella (born 1988), a Kosovar soccer player
 Mentor Zhubi (born 1984), a Swedish futsal player
 "The Mentor", the pseudonym of Loyd Blankenship, a famous hacker

Places
 3451 Mentor, Jovian asteroid

United States
Mentor, Indiana
Mentor, Kansas
Mentor, Kentucky
Mentor, Minnesota
Mentor, Missouri
Mentor, Ohio, the largest city with this name
Mentor, Washington
Mentor, West Virginia
Mentor, Wisconsin
 Mentor Township (disambiguation)
Mentor Township, Cheboygan County, Michigan
Mentor Township, Oscoda County, Michigan
Mentor-on-the-Lake, Ohio
Mentor Avenue, Lake County, Ohio

Facilities and structures
 Mentor station, a rail station in Mentor, Ohio
 Mentor High School, Mentor, Ohio
 Mentor Court, a bungalow court in Pasadena, California

Art, entertainment, and media

Fictional characters
 Mentor (comics), several characters from comics
 Mentor (A'lars), a Marvel Comics character
 Mentor, the guardian of Billy Batson/Captain Marvel in Shazam! (TV series)
 Mentor of Arisia, an extraterrestrial force in E. E. "Doc" Smith's Lensman series; see Children of the Lens
 An alien species in the Doctor Who universe

Other art, entertainment, and media
 Mentors (band), an American heavy metal band
 Mentor (film), a 2006 film starring Rutger Hauer
 Mentors (TV series), 1998 Canadian children's fantasy science fiction TV show
 The Mentor (TV series), 2018 Australian reality TV show
 The Mentor (webisodes), 2010 U.S. web extras for the U.S. version of The Office
 Mentor , a magazine for gay men published by the BLK organization

Computing and technology
 Mentor, a line of minicomputers running the Pick operating system and produced by Applied Digital Data Systems in the 1980s
 MENTOR routing algorithm, a routing algorithm for mesh networks topology

Enterprises and organizations
 MENTOR, a nonprofit organization that promotes mentorship
 Mentor (company), a supplier of surgical aesthetics products
 Mentor Books, an Irish publisher
 Mentor Foundation, an international youth development NGO
 Mentor Dynamics, a Canadian manufacturer of lifting systems
 Mentor Graphics, a company providing electronic design automation solutions
 Mentor Public Schools, Mentor, Ohio, USA

Other uses 
 Mentor (satellite), a type of U.S. reconnaissance satellite
 Mentor (ship), several ships by the name
 Miles Mentor, a 1930s British trainer aircraft
 Beechcraft T-34 Mentor, a trainer plane

See also

 Mentorship
 Mentore Maggini (1890–1941), Italian astronomer
 The Mentors Journal